Saint-Côme is the French spelling for Saint Cosmas and may also refer to:

Places
It may refer to several communities around the world:

Canada
Saint-Côme, Quebec, a parish municipality in the province of Quebec
Saint-Côme–Linière, Quebec, a municipality in the province of Quebec

France
Saint-Côme, a commune in the Gironde department in Aquitaine
Saint-Côme-d'Olt, a commune in the Aveyron department
Saint-Côme-de-Fresné, a commune in the department of Calvados in the Basse-Normandie region
Saint-Côme-du-Mont, a commune in the Manche department in Normandy
Saint-Côme-et-Maruéjols, a commune in the Gard department

Other
 Saint Come, a wine label

See also
 Come (disambiguation)
 Saint (disambiguation)